Prozor is a settlement (naselje) in the valley of river Gacka in Croatia, just south of Otočac and a part of the Town of Otočac municipality.

It is the site of the ancient Iapodic and Roman settlement of Arupium.

References

Populated places in Lika-Senj County